Feike de Vries (born 1 January 1943) is a retired Dutch water polo player. He was part of the Dutch team that placed seventh at the 1968 Summer Olympics in Mexico City.

See also
 Netherlands men's Olympic water polo team records and statistics
 List of men's Olympic water polo tournament goalkeepers

References

External links
 

1943 births
Living people
Sportspeople from Amersfoort
Dutch male water polo players
Water polo goalkeepers
Olympic water polo players of the Netherlands
Water polo players at the 1968 Summer Olympics
20th-century Dutch people